Mario Delli Colli (7 July 1915 – 29 November 1989) was an Italian actor and voice actor. He also worked as a voice actor, dubbing foreign films for release in Italy.

Selected filmography
 Five to Nil (1932)
 The Amnesiac (1936)
 Abandon All Hope (1937)
 The Priest's Hat (1944)
 I cinque dell'Adamello (1954)
 The Violent Patriot (1956)
 The Mongols (1961)
 I Kill, You Kill (1965)
 Salvo D'Acquisto (1974)

References

Bibliography
 Pitts, Michael R. Western Movies: A Guide to 5,105 Feature Films. McFarland, 2012.

External links
 

1915 births
1989 deaths
Male actors from Rome
Italian male film actors
Italian male television actors
Italian male voice actors
Italian male radio actors
Italian voice directors
20th-century Italian male actors